Chorriaca is a town located in the Loncopué Department, at east Neuquén Province, Argentina.
The town is located in the km 2543 of the National Route 40.

Population
After the 2001 national census, Chorriaca recorded 180 inhabitants.

Populated places established in 1986
Populated places in Neuquén Province
1986 establishments in Argentina